The Sentinel Range is a major mountain range situated northward of Minnesota Glacier and forming the northern half of the Ellsworth Mountains in Antarctica.

Sentinel Range comprises a main ridge (featuring Vinson Massif in its southern portion) and a number of distinct heights, ridges and mountains on its east side, including (south to north) Owen Ridge, Petvar Heights, Doyran Heights, Veregava Ridge, Flowers Hills, Sullivan Heights, Barnes Ridge, Maglenik Heights, Probuda Ridge, Bangey Heights, Sostra Heights and Gromshin Heights. It is separated from Bastien Range to the southwest by Nimitz Glacier, and from Heritage Range to the south by lower Minnesota Glacier.

The range was first sighted and photographed from the air on November 23, 1935, by Lincoln Ellsworth who in naming it recognized its prominent position as a landmark on an otherwise featureless ice surface. The range was first visited and partially surveyed in January 1958 during the Sentinel Mountains Traverse led by Charles R. Bentley. The entire range was subsequently mapped by USGS from aerial photography taken by the U.S. Navy, 1958-61.

Key mountains and peaks

Maps
 Vinson Massif.  Scale 1:250 000 topographic map.  Reston, Virginia: US Geological Survey, 1988.
 Newcomer Glacier.  Scale 1:250 000 topographic map.  Reston, Virginia: US Geological Survey, 1961.
 Antarctic Digital Database (ADD). Scale 1:250000 topographic map of Antarctica. Scientific Committee on Antarctic Research (SCAR). Since 1993, regularly updated.

Features
Geographical features include:

Bangey Heights

Bastien Range

Doyran Heights

Flowers Hills

Gromshin Heights

Maglenik Heights

Owen Ridge

Petvar Heights

Sostra Heights

Sullivan Heights

Veregava Ridge

Other features

 Ahrida Peak
 Allen Peak
 Arzos Peak
 Aster Glacier
 Beadnos Nunatak
 Bender Glacier
 Bohot Nunatak
 Boyce Ridge
 Branscomb Glacier
 Branscomb Peak
 Brichebor Peak
 Brocks Peak
 Bruguière Peak
 Bugueño Pinnacle
 Burdenis Glacier
 Cairns Glacier
 Cervellati Glacier
 Chaplin Peak
 Clinch Peak
 Corbet Peak
 Craddock Massif
 Craig Ridge
 Damien Gildea
 Debren Pass
 Della Pia Glacier
 Delyo Glacier
 Donnellan Glacier
 Doyran Heights
 Drama Glacier
 Duridanov Peak
 Elfring Peak
 Enitsa Peak
 Epperly Ridge
 Evans Peak
 Eyer Peak
 Fisher Nunatak
 Flowers Hills
 Fonfon Glacier
 Frontier Nunataks
 Fukushima Peak
 Galicia Peak
 Gerila Glacier
 Gilbert Spur
 Gildea Glacier
 Giles Glacier
 Goloe Pass
 Goodge Col
 Hammer Col
 Hariton Peak
 Helfert Nunatak
 Hinkley Glacier
 Hollister Peak
 Holth Peaks
 Howard Nunataks
 Ichev Nunatak
 Jacobsen Valley
 Knutzen Peak
 Kovil Nunatak
 Lanz Peak
 Long Gables
 MacDonald Peak
 Marts Peak
 Memolli Nunatak
 Miller Peak
 Minnesota Glacier
 Mount Alf
 Mount Anderson
 Mount Atkinson
 Mount Barden
 Mount Bearskin
 Mount Bentley
 Mount Besch
 Mount Craddock
 Mount Crawford
 Mount Dalrymple
 Mount Davis
 Mount Dawson
 Mount Epperly
 Mount Gardner
 Mount Giovinetto
 Mount Goldthwait
 Mount Hale
 Mount Holmboe
 Mount Hubley
 Mount Jumper
 Mount Liavaag
 Mount Liptak
 Mount Lymburner
 Mount Milton
 Mount Morris
 Mount Osborne
 Mount Ostenso
 Mount Press
 Mount Reimer
 Mount Rutford
 Mount Sharp
 Mount Shear
 Mount Shinn
 Mount Sisu
 Mount Slaughter
 Mount Tegge
 Mount Todd
 Mount Viets
 Mount Wyatt Earp
 Moyher Ridge
 Mursalitsa Peak
 Nell Peak
 Nikola Peak
 Obelya Glacier
 Olsen Peak
 Opalchenie Peak
 Ostrusha Nunatak
 Owen Ridge
 Pastrogor Peak
 Patton Glacier
 Podgore Saddle
 Ponor Saddle
 Príncipe de Asturias Peak
 Progled Saddle
 Rada Peak
 Ramorino Glacier
 Ranuli Ice Piedmont
 Ravulya Nunatak
 Roché Glacier
 Rumyana Glacier
 Saltzman Glacier
 Sanchez Peak
 Schatz Ridge
 Schoening Peak
 Severinghaus Glacier
 Shinn Ridge
 Shockey Peak
 Silverstein Peak
 Silyanov Peak
 Skafida Peak
 Sowers Glacier
 Stolnik Peak
 Strahil Peak
 Taylor Ledge
 Toros Peak
 Tulaczyk Glacier
 Tyree Ridge
 Valchan Peak
 Vanand Peak
 Veregava Ridge
 Versinikia Peak
 Vinson Massif
 Vinson Plateau
 Wahlstrom Peak
 Willis Ridge
 Zalmoxis Peak
 Zapol Glacier
 Zinsmeister Ridge
 Zvegor Saddle

Further reading 
 Damien Gildea, Mountaineering in Antarctica: complete guide: Travel guide

External links 
 Sentinel Range. Adjusted Copernix satellite image

References

Ellsworth Mountains
Mountain ranges of Ellsworth Land